The 2020 GT Cup Open Europe is the second season of the GT Cup Open Europe, the grand tourer-style sports car racing series founded by the Spanish GT Sport Organización. It began on 8 August at the Hungaroring and finished on 1 November at the Circuit de Barcelona-Catalunya after five double-header meetings.

Entry List

Race calendar and results 

 A provisional six-round calendar was revealed on 22 October 2019. The schedule consists of 6 circuits, all the rounds supporting the International GT Open. The series has added a round at Hockenheim and for the first time ever, the series will travel to Pergusa as part of a movement to reintroduce racing to this historic track. As a result the series has dropped the Hungaroring and Silverstone from the calendar for 2020. The new schedule has also changed the dates of the Barcelona and Monza rounds with Barcelona now hosting the season finale. On 10 January 2020, a revised schedule was released that drops Pergusa in favor of the Red Bull Ring. On 19 March 2020, it was announced that the season opening round at Le Castellet would be moved to 20-23 August in response to the coronavirus outbreak. On 6 April, 2020, it was announced that the Spa round would be postponed to a later date as well. The Barcelona round was also moved in response to avoid having races on consecutive weekends. A provisional calendar was released on 12 May 2020 with a five event calendar instead of the planned six caused by Hockenheim losing its place on the calendar due to date conflicts. The Hungaroring also replaced the Red Bull Ring on this new calendar. The only change made afterwards to this schedule was to move the date of the Hungaroring round.

Championship standings

Points systems 
Points are awarded to the top 10 (Overall) or top 6 (Am, Pro-Am, Teams) classified finishers. If less than 6 participants start the race or if less than 75% of the original race distance is completed, half points are awarded. At the end of the season, the lowest race score is dropped; however, the dropped race cannot be the result of a disqualification or race ban.

Overall

Pro-Am, Am, and Teams

Drivers' championships

Overall

Pro-Am

Am

Teams' Championship 
Only the highest two finishing cars from a team count towards the Teams' Championship

External links 

 Official website

Footnotes

References 

GT Cup Open Europe seasons
GT Cup Open Europe